El Gawafel Sportives de Gafsa or EGSG is a football club from Gafsa in Tunisia.

Performance in CAF competitions
CAF Confederation Cup: 1 appearance
2007 – Intermediate Round

Evolution
1968–69 : Division III (South-West)
1969–70 : Division II
1970–72 : Division III (South-West)
1972–76 : Division II (Centre-South)
1976–78 : Division III (South-West)
1978–80 : Division II (Centre-South)
1980–83 : Division III (South-West)
1983–88 : Division II (South)
1988–90 : Division I (Centre-South)
1990–91 : Honor Division
1991–93 : Division I (Centre-South)
1993–96 : Honor Division
1996–00 : Honor Division (South)
2000–05 : League II
2005–2016 : League I
2016-?? : League II

Former coaches

External links
 Official site
 Fans site

Football clubs in Tunisia
Association football clubs established in 1967
1967 establishments in Tunisia
Sports clubs in Tunisia